Kemball is a surname, and may refer to:

 Arnold Burrowes Kemball (1820–1908), British Army officer 
 Charles Kemball (1923–1998), Scottish chemist
 Colin Kemball (1928–2004), English athlete
 George Kemball (1859–1941), British Army officer
 John Kemball (1939–2021), Royal Air Force officer

See also 
 Kemble (disambiguation)